Arpelar is an unincorporated community and census-designated place in Pittsburg County, Oklahoma, United States. Its population was 272 as of the 2010 census. U.S. Route 270 and Oklahoma State Highway 1 pass through the community.

History
Arpelar was named after Aaron Arpelar, a county judge of Tobucksy County in the Choctaw Nation. At the time of its founding, Arpelar was located in Tobucksy County.  A post office was established at Arpelar, Indian Territory on February 25, 1903.  It closed on June 30, 1934.

Geography

Demographics

References

Unincorporated communities in Pittsburg County, Oklahoma
Unincorporated communities in Oklahoma
Census-designated places in Pittsburg County, Oklahoma
Census-designated places in Oklahoma